Rhamphomyia heterochroma is a species of dance flies, in the fly family Empididae. It is included in the subgenus Holoclera of the genus Rhamphomyia.

References

Rhamphomyia
Asilomorph flies of Europe
Taxa named by Mario Bezzi
Insects described in 1898